Wesel  is a city in North Rhine-Westphalia, Germany.

Wesel may also refer to:
Wesel (district), North Rhine-Westphalia, Germany
Wesel station, Wessel, Germany
Wesel citadel, Wessel, Germany
A former village, now part of Jeżewo-Wesel, Poland

People with the surname
Hermann Wesel (died 1563), German ecclesiastic in Livonia and the last Roman Catholic Bishop of Dorpat (Tartu)
Johann Ruchrat von Wesel (died 1481), German Scholastic theologian
Andries van Wesel, known as Andreas Vesalius (1514– 1564), Brabançon anatomist and physician